Salat al-Tawbah; (Prayer of Repentance, also Namaz-e-Tawbah) is a Muslim prayer consisting of two rak'as (units or cycles of ritual prayer),  according to Sunni tradition, or four rak'as, according to Shi'a tradition. The prayer is called for if a Muslim falls into sin—whether the sin is major or minor.

Shia method

In the Shia Islam tradition, the prayer is performed as follows:
 Perform Ghusl by way of Irtimasi (submerging the whole body in water, either in stages or at once) or by way of Tartibi (wiping the body with water).
 Perform wudu
 Perform a four rakah prayer. It is the same as a regular 4 prayer except the following, which the one offering the prayer says in every rakah:
 Surah al-Fatiha once
 Surah al-Ikhlas three times
 Surah al-Falaq once
 Surah an-Nas once
 After the prayer, say Astaghfirullah rabbi wa atubu 'ilayh
 After saying the above, say: Laa hawla wa laa quwwata illa billaahil a'liyyil a'zeem. Then say: Yaa A'zeezo yaa ghaffooro ighfirli zunoobi wa zunooba Jamee'il mo-mineena wal mo-minaate. Fa innahu laa yaghfiro illa ant.

References

External links
  contains the Hadith detailing the method, as described by the Prophet

Salah
Salah terminology